Ambrosia Software was a predominantly Macintosh software company founded in 1993 and located in Rochester, New York, U.S. Ambrosia Software was best known for its Macintosh remakes of older arcade games, which began with a 1992 version of Atari, Inc.'s Asteroids from 1979. The company also published utility software. Its products were distributed as shareware; demo versions could be downloaded and used for up to 30 days. Later the company released some products for iOS. Ambrosia's best-selling program was the utility Snapz Pro X, according to a 2002 interview with company president Andrew Welch.

In 2017, customers reported on Ambrosia's Facebook page that attempts to contact the company were unsuccessful and they were unable to make new purchases. As of July 2019, the website is offline. As of May 2021, the website resolves but leads to a domain parking page with ads unconnected to the company.

History 
The first game distributed under the Ambrosia Software name was Maelstrom, a 1992 remake of the 1979 Asteroids arcade video game. It uses raster graphics similar in style to Atari's later Blasteroids (1987) and the Atari ST game Megaroids (1988). Despite the concept being 13 years old at the time of release, Maelstrom was popular at a time when Macintosh action games were in short supply, and it won some software awards.

Ambrosia Software was incorporated August 18, 1993, by Andrew Welch after he graduated from the Rochester Institute of Technology in 1992. Maelstrom was followed by more action games, including  Apeiron (a remake of Centipede), Swoop (a clone of Galaxian), and Barrack (a clone of JezzBall). In 1999, Cameron Crotty of Macworld wrote that "No other company has gotten so much mileage out of renovating mid-1980s arcade hits."

Nearly all of the company's ten employees were laid off in 2013, but Welch denied rumors of the company closing. In late 2018, the company's last remaining employee announced that Ambrosia was officially shutting down operations.

Products

Games 
Ambrosia Software's games, in order of release:
 Maelstrom  Asteroids remake
 Chiral
 Apeiron  Centipede remake
 Swoop  Galaxian clone
 Barrack  JezzBall clone
 Escape Velocity
 Avara
 Bubble Trouble  Pengo remake
 Harry the Handsome Executive
 Mars Rising
 EV Override
 Slithereens
 Cythera
 Ares
 Ferazel's Wand
 Pillars of Garendall
 Deimos Rising
 Coldstone game engine
 Escape Velocity Nova
 Bubble Trouble X  Mac OS X port of original, with minor gameplay changes
 pop-pop
 Uplink  Mac OS X port
 Aki
 Apeiron X  Mac OS X port of the original, with enhanced graphics
 GooBall
 Darwinia  Mac OS X port
 El Ballo
 Redline
 SketchFighter 4000 Alpha
 DEFCON  Mac OS X port
 pop-pop  Universal Binary release
 Uplink  Universal Binary release
 Aki  Universal Binary release
 Mondo Solitaire
 Aki  iPhone/iPod Touch release
 Aquaria  Mac OS X port
 Escape Velocity Nova  Universal Binary release
 Multiwinia  Mac OS X port
 Hypnoblocks
Ambrosia, in conjunction with DG Associates, has also released the Escape Velocity Nova Card Game.

Productivity software 
Ambrosia Software's utilities, in order of release:
 Eclipse — Screen saver CDEV
 Big Cheese Key — FKey to mask screen image from boss.
 FlashWrite — Text editor Desk Accessory
 FlashWrite ][
 ColorSwitch — Menu bar item to change monitor color depth
 EasyEnvelopes — Envelope printing Desk accessory. Later a Mac OS X v10.4 and Mac OS X v10.5 Dashboard widget.
 Snapz
 To Do!
 Oracle
 ColorSwitch Pro
 Snapz Pro — Screen capture application
 iSeek — Desktop search application
 Snapz Pro X — Mac OS X-compatible version of original
 WireTap Pro — Audio recording utility
 Screen Cleaner Pro — April Fool's joke
 Dragster — File transfer application
 iToner — iPhone custom ringtone transfer utility
 WireTap Studio — Audio recording, editing and master storage; won a 2007 "Eddy Award" from Macworld
 WireTap Anywhere — professional virtual audio patchbay utility, enabling the recording of any Mac OS X application's audio output from within any Mac OS X audio application.
 Soundboard — Mac OS X Audio playback ("computerized cart machine")
 Big Cheese Key X — Mac OS X-compatible version of original

Shareware policies 
One of Ambrosia's founding mantras was that shareware software should not be distributed as crippleware. The company's software was released on the honor system with only a short reminder that you had used the unregistered software for "x" amount of time, creating what is commonly called nagware.

This policy was later changed and the company employed typical shareware piracy prevention measures, as well as more innovative ones such as used in the Escape Velocity line of games where the team's mascot, Hector the Parrot (known in-game as Cap'n Hector), would use her heavily armed ship to ceaselessly attack players of unregistered copies after the trial period had expired. Their software products therefore began to fall under the category of crippleware. Now that the company no longer provides new expiring license codes, customers who had purchased Ambrosia software are now treated as though they have expired trial versions, meaning, for instance, that Cap'n Hector's attacks in Escape Velocity games cannot be stopped.

Matt Slot has written about the factors that played into the policy change.

References

External links 
 
 The Ambrosia Archive (a fan-run archive of Ambrosia Software installers)

American companies established in 1993
American companies disestablished in 2019
 
Companies based in Rochester, New York
Macintosh software companies
Defunct video game companies of the United States
Video game development companies
Video game companies established in 1993
Video game companies disestablished in 2019
Privately held companies based in New York (state)
Defunct companies based in New York (state)
1993 establishments in New York (state)
2019 disestablishments in New York (state)
Defunct software companies of the United States